Labzin is a Russian male surname. Its feminine counterpart is Labzina. It may refer to

Alexander Labzin (1766–1825), a leading figure of the Russian Enlightenment
Alexey Labzin (born 1978), Russian Paralympian athlete 
Vladislav Labzin (born 1996), Russian football player

Russian-language surnames